Saeedabad may refer to

 Saeedabad, Karachi, neighbourhood of Karachi, Pakistan
 Saeedabad, Khyber Pakhtunkhwa, village in Khyber Pakhtunkhwa, Pakistan
 Saeedabad Taluka, subdivision of Matiari District, Pakistan
 Saidabad (disambiguation), places in Iran